Nancy M. Petry (November 1, 1968 – July 17, 2018) was a psychologist known for her research on behavioral treatments for addictive disorders, behavioral pharmacology,  impulsivity and compulsive gambling. She was Professor of Medicine at the University of Connecticut Health Center. Petry served as a member of the American Psychiatric Association Workgroup on Substance Use Disorders for the DSM-5 and chaired the Subcommittee on Non-Substance Behavioral Addictions. The latter category includes Internet addiction disorder and problem gambling. She also served as a member of the Board of Advisors of Children and Screens: Institute of Digital Media and Child Development.

Petry received the American Psychological Association (APA) Award for Distinguished Scientific Early Career Contributions to Psychology in 2003 for "groundbreaking work on the problem of gambling and substantial contributions to the treatment of other addictive behaviors." Petry's other awards include the APA Young Psychopharmacologist Award (1999), the National Center for Responsible Gaming Award for Scientific Achievement in Gambling Studies (2002), the Joseph Cochin Award from the College on Problems of Drug Dependence (2007), and the Connecticut Technology Council's Women of Innovation Award for Research Innovation and Leadership (2017).

Biography
Petry completed a bachelor's degree at the Randolph Macon Woman's College in 1990 and a PhD in Experimental Psychology at Harvard University in 1994. She conducted clinical research on drug abuse at the University of Vermont from 1994–96, where she evaluated optimal dosing strategies for opioid-dependent patients. Petry joined the Faculty of Medicine at the University of Connecticut Health Center in 1996 and she conducted clinical research on the effectiveness of contingency management as treatment for addiction. She served as the Editor-in-Chief of the journal Psychology of Addictive Behaviors.

Petry was the author of Contingency Management for Substance Abuse Treatment: A Guide to Implementing This Evidence-Based Practice, which provided an overview of clinical behavior analysis, utilizing positive reinforcement and stimulus control to treat problematic behavior. Petry also authored Pathological Gambling: Etiology, Comorbidity, and Treatment, and was the editor of the volume Behavioral Addictions: DSM-5® and Beyond. Her research was funded by the National Institute on Drug Abuse, the National Institute of Mental Health, and the National Institute on Alcohol Abuse and Alcoholism.

Death
Petry died of breast cancer, aged 49, on July 17, 2018, in Canton, Connecticut.

Research 
Petry conducted research that aimed to improve behavioral treatments for individuals with addictive disorders, ranging from substance use disorder to pathological gambling to Internet addiction. She aimed to increase patient adherence to treatment through contingency management, which is a form of behavior modification.

Petry was involved analyzing data from the National Epidemiologic Survey on Alcohol and Related Conditions, a large-scale study involving a diverse sample of over 36,000 individuals. Petry's work on this study examined various forms of impulsive behavior including gambling and shoplifting, and comorbidity of addictive behavior with other conditions including obesity and other medical problems.

Other work examined delay discounting in relation to impulsiveness. Delay discounting refers to the decline in the value of a reward when there is a delay in its receipt.  Petry's work demonstrated that heroin addicts showed a steeper decline in the value of a delayed reward relative to controls, indicative of a stronger preference for immediate rewards.

Representative publications

References

1968 births
2018 deaths
20th-century American psychologists
American women psychologists
University of Connecticut faculty
Harvard University alumni
Deaths from breast cancer
American women academics
21st-century American women
People from Aberdeen, South Dakota